The Yanac railway line was a railway line in Victoria, Australia, branching off of the Yaapeet railway line at Jeparit station. It was opened in two stages from Jeparit to Lorquon on December 10, 1912, and Lorquon to Yanac in 1916. It was closed in late 1986.

History 
The line was first opened only to Lorquon, but work on the extension to Yanac began in 1915 and was finished in 1916, with the first trains running in June. Between 1938 and 1939, bulk grain silos were provided at all stations . The last passenger service to Yanac ran sometime in the 1950s. The line was officially closed in 1986.

Line Guide 

Branched from Yaapeet railway line at Jeparit station

Detpa

Lorquon

Netherby

Yanac

References 

Closed regional railway lines in Victoria (Australia)
Railway lines opened in 1912
Railway lines closed in 1986